Saint Kitts and Nevis competed at the 2018 Commonwealth Games in the Gold Coast, Australia from April 4 to April 15, 2018.

Beach volleyball athlete St Clair Hodge was the islands' flag bearer during the opening ceremony.

Competitors
The following is the list of number of competitors participating at the Games per sport/discipline.

Athletics

Saint Kitts and Nevis participated with 3 athletes (2 men and 1 woman). Antoine Adams, Jermaine Francis and Kristal Liburd, originally on the team did not compete.

Men
Track & road events

Women
Track & road events

Beach volleyball

Saint Kitts and Nevis qualified a men's beach volleyball team for a total of two athletes.

Table tennis

Saint Kitts and Nevis participated with 2 athletes (1 man and 1 woman).

Singles

Doubles

See also
Saint Kitts and Nevis at the 2018 Summer Youth Olympics

References

Nations at the 2018 Commonwealth Games
Saint Kitts and Nevis at the Commonwealth Games
2018 in Saint Kitts and Nevis